The greyish mourner (Rhytipterna simplex) is a species of bird in the family Tyrannidae.
It is found in Bolivia, Brazil, Colombia, Ecuador, French Guiana, Guyana, Peru, Suriname, and Venezuela.
Its natural habitat is subtropical or tropical moist lowland forest.

References

greyish mourner
Birds of the Amazon Basin
Birds of the Guianas
Birds of the Atlantic Forest
greyish mourner
Birds of Brazil
Taxonomy articles created by Polbot